Wim Cuyvers (born 19 February 1958) is a contemporary Belgian architect living in Chatillon, France.

Cuyvers is known for blending design projects, with a specific interest in private houses and schools, and study projects, a.o. into the postwar condition of cities like Sarajevo and Prishtina and into informal uses at rest places along highways. Wim Cuyvers quit architectural practice after having a highly successful career, with a solo exhibition at deSingel Art Centre in Antwerp (1995) and winning the prestigious culture award by the Flemish Government (2005). In 2000 Cuyvers moved to the Jura in France to start a refuge project called Montavoix. Although latest works has been often categorized as art, Wim Cuyvers still claims these works to be site-specific meditations on public space and architecture more in general.

Biography
Born in Hasselt, Belgium, Wim Cuyvers graduated in architecture at the Ghent Academy (1977–82). He worked in the United States at Preston Phillips and Venturi, Rauch & Scott Brown. Later he worked at Paul Robbrecht and Hilde Daem Architects in Ghent, Belgium. He started his own architectural office in 1984 in Ghent, Belgium. Cuyvers has been teaching at the Sint-Lucas School of Architecture in Ghent, the Academie voor Bouwkunst in Tilburg and the Design Academy Eindhoven. Until 2008 he has been advising researcher at the Jan van Eyck Academie in Maastricht.

Projects
 Woning Baete Doubbel, private house, Gits, 2000. 
 Weeping Building, crematorium, Sint-Niklaas, competition entry, 2004.
 Stroom Arts Centre, centre for visual arts, The Hague, 2005. 
 Intervention at Rozebeke Cemetery, in the context of the Zwalm & Art Biennial, 2007.
 Namahn, private house and office, Saint-Josse-ten-Noode, 2009.
 Montavoix, refuge, near St-Claude, France, 2000-ongoing.

Bibliography
 Wim Cuyvers, exhibition catalogue with texts by Wim Cuyvers and Bart Lootsma, deSingel, Antwerp, 1995.  
 Beograd The Hague. About the impossibility of planning, Stroom, Den Haag, 2003.  
 Text on Text, Stroom, Den Haag, 2005.  
 Brakin. Brazzaville-Kinshasa. Visualizing the visible. with Agency, Kristien Van den Brande, Tina Clausmeyer, Dirk Pauwels & SMAQ, Lars Müller Verlag, Baden and Jan van Eyck Academie, Maastricht. With Agency, Kristien Van den Brande, Tina Clausmeyer, Dirk Pauwels & SMAQ.  
 Poor Being Poor, Initia, Brussel, 2011.   
 L'Autre, Frans Masereel Centrum, Kasterlee, 2020.

Theater
In 2012 Cuyvers did the scenography for the play MEDIUM (Buda Kunstencentrum & De Werf & Vrijstaat O.) written by Tijs Ceulemans, Peter Aers and Leentje Vandenbussche.

Awards
On 8 February 2006 Wim Cuyvers received the prestigious Flemish Culture Prize 2005 (Cultuurprijs Vlaanderen 2005) in the Architecture category.

References

External links
 http://montavoix.blogspot.be/

Belgian architects
Architectural activism
21st-century Belgian architects
Architectural theoreticians
Urban theorists
Living people
People from Hasselt
1958 births